{{DISPLAYTITLE:C22H28O4}}
The molecular formula C22H28O4 may refer to:

 Gestadienol acetate, an orally active progestin
 Vamorolone, a synthetic steroid
 Estradiol diacetate, an estrogen ester

Molecular formulas